Koncert u KUD France Prešeren is a live album released in 1997 by Montenegrin-Serbian musician Rambo Amadeus. It was recorded in the cultural hall of France Prešeren Culture and Arts Association (shortly ) in Ljubljana, Slovenia.

Track listing
 "Titanik"
 "Penzija"
 "Šakom u glavu"
 "Balkan boy"
 "LM hit"
 "Beton"
 "Zganje Rave"
 "Po šumama (Of Rising Sun)"
 "Amerika i Engleska"
 "Fukara i raja"
 "Prijatelju"
 "F.A.P. mašina"
 "Pomladna voda"

External links
R.A. u KUD France Prešeren on Rambo Amadeus' official web site

Rambo Amadeus albums
1998 live albums
Albums recorded in Slovenia